Glenstal may refer to:
 Glenstal Abbey, an Irish Benedictine monastery
 Glenstal Abbey School, an Irish boarding school for boys
 Glenstal (horse)